Muzillac is a commune in the Morbihan department of Brittany in north-western France. Inhabitants of Muzillac are called in French Muzillacais.

Population

See also
Communes of the Morbihan department
The works of Jean Fréour Sculptor with work in Muzillac church.

References

External links

Official website 
Mayors of Morbihan Association 

Communes of Morbihan